Rodrigo de Araya is an elevated metro station on the Line 5 of the Santiago Metro, in Santiago, Chile. The station consists of an elliptical cylindrical structure enclosing the side platforms and tracks. Staircases jut out from the tubular structure and lead to the concourse level, which is located below the viaduct deck. The station was opened on 5 April 1997 as part of the inaugural section of the line, from Baquedano to Bellavista de La Florida.

The renovation project included the use of tensile roofing structures to cover the newer portion of the station, as well as the open portion of the original station.

References

Santiago Metro stations
Railway stations opened in 1997
Santiago Metro Line 5